The 1968–69 Duke Blue Devils men's basketball team represented Duke University in the 1968–69 NCAA Division I men's basketball season. The head coach was Vic Bubas and the team finished the season with an overall record of 15–13 and did not qualify for the NCAA tournament.

References 

Duke Blue Devils men's basketball seasons
Duke
1968 in sports in North Carolina
1969 in sports in North Carolina